Flint is a type of rock.

Flint may also refer to:

Places

United States
 Flint, Georgia, an unincorporated community
 Flint, Indiana, an unincorporated community
 Flint, Kentucky, a former unincorporated community
 Flint, Michigan, a city (birthplace of General Motors), was notably affected by the Flint water crisis
 Flint, Ohio, an unincorporated community
 Flint, Texas, an unincorporated community
 Flint, Washington, an unincorporated community
 Flint, West Virginia, an unincorporated community
 Flint Township, Pike County, Illinois
 Flint Township, Michigan, a charter township
 Flint Township, Stutsman County, North Dakota, Stutsman County, North Dakota
 Flint Hills, a physiographic region located in Kansas and Oklahoma
 Flint River (disambiguation), several
 Flint Creek (Alabama)
 Flint Creek (Arkansas/Oklahoma)
 Flint Creek (New York)
 The Flint, a neighborhood in Fall River, Massachusetts

Wales
 Flint, Flintshire, a town
 Flint Castle
 Flintshire (historic), also known as the County of Flint, one of Wales' thirteen historic counties and a former administrative county

Elsewhere
 Flint Island, an uninhabited atoll in the Pacific Ocean under the jurisdiction of Kiribati
 Flint Ridge, Victoria Land, Antarctica

People 
 Flint (surname)
 Flint (given name)

Arts and entertainment

Fictional characters 
 Flint (G.I. Joe), in the G.I. Joe universe
 Flint (Marvel Comics), an Inhuman character appearing in Marvel Comics
 Flint (Mother 3), a playable character in Nintendo's Mother 3
 Flint (Pokémon), in the Pokémon universe
 Flint, the protagonist in the Cluster series, by Piers Anthony
 Flint, the immortal antagonist in the episode "Requiem for Methuselah" of the original Star Trek series
 Flint, Ruth and Kate Galloway's cat in Elly Griffiths' Ruth Galloway novel series
 Derek Flint, protagonist of the spy movie Our Man Flint and its sequels
 Marcus Flint, in the Harry Potter books
 Captain Flint, a character in the novel Treasure Island by Robert Louis Stevenson; a parrot named for him also appears in the book
 Flint Fireforge, a dwarf in the Dragonlance chronicles
 Flint Hammerhead, in the Japanese animated television series Flint the Time Detective
 Ms. Flint, a character in the 2001 Disney/Pixar animated film Monsters, Inc.
 Flint Lockwood, the main character of the film Cloudy with a Chance of Meatballs
 Sandman (Marvel Comics), aka Flint Marko

Music 
 Flint (band)
 Flint, a late 1970s rock band from Flint, Michigan, formed by ex-Grand Funk Railroad musicians Don Brewer, Mel Schacher and Craig Frost

Other arts and entertainment 
 Flint County, San Andreas, a fictional county in Grand Theft Auto San Andreas
 Flint (film), a 2017 TV film about the Flint water crisis

Ships 
 USS Flint (AE-32), later USNS Flint (T-AE-32), an ammunition ship commissioned in 1971
 USS Flint (CL-64), a light cruiser commissioned in 1944 as USS Vincennes
 USS Flint (CL-97), a cruiser of World War II

Sports 
 IL Flint, a Norwegian football club
 Flint Tønsberg, a women's handball team
 Flint Metro League, a high school sports league in the Flint area of Michigan

Transportation 
 Flint (automobile), a Durant automobile from the 1920s named after Flint, Michigan, United States
 Flint railway station, Flint, Wales, United Kingdom

Other uses 
 Flint Deanery, a Roman Catholic deanery in the Diocese of Wrexham in Wales
 Flint Group, a manufacturing company based in Luxembourg
 Flint Laboratory, an academic building and former dairy laboratory at the University of Massachusetts Amherst
 Flint School, a former preparatory school in Sarasota, Florida, United States
 Flint (theatre), Amersfoort, Netherlands
 Flint, a chimpanzee that was featured in several books and documentaries
 Chalicosis, also called Flint disease
 Fast Library for Number Theory, software

See also

 
 
 Flynt (disambiguation)